Alfons Kemper (born 1958) is a German computer scientist and a full professor for database systems at the Technical University of Munich.

Education and career 
Kemper studied computer science at the Technical University of Dortmund from 1977 to 1981 (Vordiplom) and the University of Southern California in Los Angeles (Master of Science) and finished his PhD in 1984 under the supervision of Ellis Horowitz. From 1984 to 1991 he worked with Peter Lockemann at the University of Karlsruhe and habilitated there. In 1991 he became associate professor at the Chair of Computer Science III at RWTH Aachen, and two years later he joined  the University of Passau as a full professor. There, Kemper was dean of the Faculty of Mathematics and Computer Science from October 2001 to October 2003. Since 2004, he is leading the database group at the TU Munich as successor of Rudolf Bayer. The group is involved in the Bavarian elite study program in software engineering. Kemper was dean of the Faculty of Informatics from winter term 2006 to summer term 2010 and will be Head of Computer Science of the newly founded School of Computation, Information and Technology from October 2022.
From November 2010 to March 2017, Kemper was spokesperson for the database systems division of the German Informatics Society (GI) and was appointed fellow of the GI in 2015.

Research 
For a time, Kemper's research was focusing on object-oriented databases. Meanwhile, main memory database systems are the focus of his research. Together with Thomas Neumann, he designed the main memory database system HyPer, which was sold to Tableau Software in 2016, and is working on its successor system Umbra.

Awards 
 2021 ICDE Ten-Year Influential Paper Award
 2022 ACM Fellow

Books 
 with Eickler: Datenbanksysteme - Eine Einführung. De Gruyter (tenth edition), 2015
 with Wimmer: Übungsbuch Datenbanksysteme. Oldenbourg (third edition), 2011

References

External links 
 Homepage of Alfons Kemper
 publications indexed in the Digital Bibliography & Library Project (DBLP)
 HyPer: Hybrid OLTP&OLAP High-Performance Database System
 Umbra: A Disk-Based System with In-Memory Performance

1958 births
German computer scientists
Database researchers
Living people
Academic staff of the Technical University of Munich
Academic staff of RWTH Aachen University
Academic staff of the University of Passau
University of Southern California alumni
Technical University of Dortmund alumni
Karlsruhe Institute of Technology alumni
Fellows of the Association for Computing Machinery